Issa Alexandrovich Pliyev (also spelled as Pliev; ; ;  — 6 February 1979) was a Soviet military commander. Pliyev would rise to become the premier cavalry general of the Soviet Army. He became Army General (1962), twice Hero of the Soviet Union (16 April 1944 and 8 September 1945), Hero of the Mongolian People's Republic (1971). 

During World War II, Pliyev commanded several mechanized cavalry units, ranging from regiments to army corps. The military historians David Glantz and Jonathan House described Pliyev as a "great practitioner of cavalry operations in adverse terrain". Pliyev became known in the West largely for his involvement in the Cuban Missile Crisis.

Early life and career
Issa Pliyev started his military career in the Red Army in 1922. He graduated from the Leningrad Cavalry school in 1926, from the Frunze Military Academy in 1933 and from the Soviet General Staff Academy. He joined the Communist party in 1926.

Upon graduation from the Red Army Frunze Military Academy he was appointed head of the operational department of the headquarters of the 5th Stavropol Cavalry Division named after M. F. Blinov in the Ukrainian Military District. Since June 1936, he has been an instructor at the staff of the Joint Military School of the Mongolian People's Revolutionary Army in Ulaanbaatar. Since February 1939, he commanded the 48th Cavalry Regiment of the 6th Cavalry Division of the Belarusian Special Military District. At the head of the regiment, he took part in the campaign of the Red Army in Western Belarus in September 1939.

World War II
At the start of the invasion of the Soviet Union, Pliyev commanded the 50th Cavalry Division (renamed 3rd Guards Cavalry Division). During early stages of operation Barbarossa the unit was send under the command of the 30th army then the division was moved to the 22nd Army. Later under the command of Dovator, he participated in two raids on the rear of Army Group "Center" during the Battle of Smolensk. 

His unit participated in the Battle of Moscow and the Battle of Stalingrad. Pliyev served as 2nd in command under Lev Dovator who fought alongside Rokossovsky with the crucial 16th Army, holding the center defensive line of Moscow. In Soviet Union and Russia 28 Panfilov's men became a symbol of defense for propaganda. However, the cavalrymen of Lev Dovator were mainly forgotten even though they held their line alongside Panfilovs men. With Dovator killed in action and Belov promoted to an army commander, Pliev was able to apply deep battle operations better than any other general which eventually made him the only Soviet cavalry personnel to receive two Heroes of the Soviet Union. His valuable experience serving directly under Lev Dovator while planning and fighting with the best especially in the early stages of the war made him stand out among others. When more tanks were added to the cavalry corps, Pliyev became the pioneer in the newly cavalry mechanized groups who immediately proved themselves in battle. This made him well respected among his peers and soldiers.These forces along with that of Pavel Belov were the most successful cavalry units of the Battle of Moscow.

During the Battle of Stalingrad, the horsemen proved themselves once again, Pliyev's forces were the first to complete the encirclement of the German 6th Army, thus trapping 330,000 men inside the pocket. Issa would later command a cavalry-mechanized group consisting of 4th Guards Cavalry Corps and 4th Mechanized Corps during the Bereznegovatoye–Snigirevka Offensive along the Black Sea coast, as part of the 3rd Ukrainian Front under Army General Rodion Malinovsky.

Pliyev especially distinguished himself in the Bereznegovato-Snigireva and Odessa offensive operations conducted one after the other in March-April 1944. The cavalry-mechanized group of General Pliev, introduced into the raid on the enemy's rear in March 1944, ensured the encirclement and defeat of units of the 6th German Army. In April, the cavalry mechanized group forced the Southern Bug River, cut the enemy's main communications and contributed to the capture of a number of large settlements by the front's troops, including the city of Odessa. 

By the decree of the Presidium of the Supreme Soviet of the USSR dated April 16, 1944, Lieutenant General Issa Alexandrovich Pliev was awarded the title of Hero of the Soviet Union with the award of the Order of Lenin and the Gold Star medal for his skillful command of the troops and personal courage and heroism.

During Operation Bagration in the summer of 1944, part of the 1st Belorussian Front, Pliyev's cavalry-mechanized group attacked towards Slutsk. According to Glantz and House, the unit was highly successful in exploiting the operational breakthrough. In the fall of 1944, he commanded a cavalry-mechanized group consisting of two divisions during the Battle of Debrecen. The cavalry mechanized group was returned to the 3rd Ukrainian Front, where on October 3, 1944, General Pliyev was put in charge of: the 4th and 6th Guards Cavalry Corps and the 7th Mechanized Corps. Such a units were created with the aim of a deep breakthrough into the enemy rear in the Debrecen operation on the territory of Hungary. The task of the breakthrough was completed, but then the enemy managed to cut the communications of the group. For more than 10 days, the fighters fought in the enemy's rear, dodging enemy tank attacks and delivering unexpected retaliatory strikes. Some of the occupied Hungarian cities had to be abandoned, but in the end the situation was turned in favor of the Soviet troops and Debrecen was taken.

The operations of Lieutenant General Pliev's 1st Guards Cavalry Mechanized Group demonstrates its usefulness as it fought through Ukraine, Eastern Europe and into Germany. 

He ended the war in command of the Soviet-Mongolian Cavalry-Mechanized Group of the Transbaikal front in Manchuria, fighting against the Japanese Kwantung Army. For his success in defeating the Kwantung Army, he was awarded the second Gold Star Medal of the Hero of the Soviet Union.

Post-war
After the war, Pliyev continued his career in the military, and took command of the Stavropol Military District in February 1946. In June he became commander of the 9th Mechanized Army, stationed in Romania with the Southern Group of Forces. He commanded 13th Army between February 1947 and 1949, in western Ukraine. Pliyev graduated from higher academic courses at the Military Academy of the General Staff in 1949, and in April took command of the 4th Army in the Transcaucasian Military District. In June 1955, he was appointed First Deputy commander of the North Caucasus Military District, succeeding to command of the district in April 1958.

On 27 April 1962 Pliyev was promoted to Army General. In June his troops took part in suppressing Novocherkassk riots. During the Cuban Missile Crisis he was the commander of Group of Soviet forces as part of the Operation Anadyr in Cuba from July 1962 to May 1963. After returning from Cuba, he assumed command of the North Caucasus Military District again.

In June 1968, Pliyev became an advisor for the Ministry of Defense of the USSR's Group of Inspectors General, a position for elderly senior officers. He lived in Rostov-on-Don and died on 6 February 1979 in Moscow. Pliyev was buried in the Walk of Fame in Vladikavkaz.

Awards
Pliyev was awarded five Orders of Lenin, three Orders of the Red Banner, two Orders of Suvorov (1st Class), Order of Kutuzov (1st Class), numerous medals and nine foreign orders. He was decorated twice Hero of the Soviet Union.

Books authored

Плиев И.А.. Через Гоби и Хинган (Through the Gobi Desert and the Khingan Mountains). 1965.
Плиев И.А.. Конец Квантунской армии (The End of the Kwantung Army). 1969

See also
 Soviet invasion of Manchuria
 Pavel Belov
 Lev Dovator

References

Harrel, John (2019). Soviet Cavalry Operations During The Second World War: The Genesis Of The Operational Manoeuvre Group. Pen & Sword Military.

Cited sources

 

1903 births
1979 deaths
People from North Ossetia–Alania
People from Terek Oblast
Ossetian people
Central Committee of the Communist Party of the Soviet Union candidate members
Second convocation members of the Soviet of Nationalities
Third convocation members of the Soviet of the Union
Fourth convocation members of the Soviet of the Union
Fifth convocation members of the Soviet of Nationalities
Sixth convocation members of the Soviet of Nationalities
Seventh convocation members of the Soviet of Nationalities
Army generals (Soviet Union)
People of the Soviet invasion of Poland
Soviet military personnel of World War II
Military Academy of the General Staff of the Armed Forces of the Soviet Union alumni
Heroes of the Soviet Union
Recipients of the Order of Lenin
Recipients of the Order of the Red Banner
Recipients of the Order of Suvorov, 1st class
Recipients of the Order of Kutuzov, 1st class
Commanders of the Legion of Merit
Frunze Military Academy alumni